Nuclear energy in Iran may refer to:

 The nuclear program of Iran, launched in the 1950s
 Bushehr Nuclear Power Plant, a power plant in Iran being used for nuclear power

See also 

 Nuclear power by country